Aurora was launched at Chester in 1793 as a West Indiaman. During her career first the French (twice) and then the United States captured her, but she returned to British hands. Between 1801 and 1808 she made four voyages as a slave ship. She continued to trade widely until 1831.

Career
Aurora first appeared in Lloyd's Register (LR) in 1794. Her master was listed as A. Harper, her owner as Kensington & Co., and trade London–St Vincent.

Aurora then disappeared from LR until 1798. The 1795 volume is missing pages. A letter dated 26 June 1795, at St Pierre, Martinique, reported the capture by the French of several ships from the West India convoy, including "Aurora, Merchantman". Lloyd's List (LL) reported on 17 June 1796 that  had captured "Aurora (late Hooper)", as Aurora was sailing from Guadeloupe to France. Cleopatra sent Aurora into Halifax, Nova Scotia.

Aurora re-entered LR in 1798 R. Redman, master, Mallough, owner, and trade London–Barbados.

The French privateer Mouche captured Aurora, Redman, master, as she was near the Western Islands while sailing from London to Barbados. Mouche also captured , Finlay, master, which was sailing from London to Martinique.  recaptured them both.

LR for 1801 showed Aurora with R. Redman, master, changing to T.Royle, Mallough, owner, changing to G.Case, and trade London–Barbados, changing to Liverpool–Africa.

1st slave voyage (1801–1803): Captain Thomas Sedgewick Royle sailed from Liverpool on 1 November 1801. Aurora purchased her slaves at Calabar and on 11 October 1802 delivered about 300 to Saint Thomas. She left St Thomas on 1 January 1803 and arrived back at Liverpool on 3 March. She had left Liverpool with 32 crew members and suffered eight crew deaths on the voyage.

2nd slave voyage (1803–1804):  Captain Thomas Chamley sailed from Liverpool on 28 April 1803. Captain Thomas Chambey acquired a letter of marque on 2 July 1803. Aurora purchased her slaves on the African coast and arrived at Kingston, Jamaica, on 9 April 1804, where she landed 262 slaves. She sailed from Kingston on 17 June, and arrived at Liverpool on 11 August. She had left with 31 crew members and she suffered eight crew deaths on her voyage.

3rd slave voyage (1804–1806): Captain Thomas Chamley, Jr. sailed from Liverpool 1 November 1804 and commenced purchasing slaves at Calabar on 14 January 1805. She arrived at Kingston on 15 August and tree landed 219 saves. She left Kingston on 9 May 1806, and arrived back at Liverpool on 4 July. At some point on the voyage Captain William Gilbert had replaced Chamley. Aurora had left Liverpool with 49 crew members and she had suffered 14 crew deaths on the voyage.

4th slave voyage (1806–1808): Captain Vincent May sailed from Liverpool on 29 September 1806. She purchased her slaves at Bonny and Calabar, and arrived at Kingston on 27 June 1807. There she landed 229 slaves. She left Kingston on 27 November, and arrived back at Liverpool on 27 January 1808. She had left Liverpool with 55 crew members and she had suffered nine crew deaths on the voyage.

The Slave Trade Act 1807 had abolished the British slave trade but because Aurora had cleared to sail before 1 May 1807 her voyage was legal.

On her return Aurora underwent a good repair in 1808 and then became a West Indiaman.

On 18 February 1815 the American schooner privateer Fox, captured Aurora, Scott, master, but because Aurora was in ballast, released her. Aurora arrived at Barbados on the 22nd.

Fate
Aurora was last listed in LR in 1831 with J. Herring, master, and Buchanan, owner, but with no trade. She was last listed in 1833 in the Register of Shipping with stale data since 1830.

Citations

1793 ships
Age of Sail merchant ships of England
Captured ships